A workstation is a special computer designed for technical or scientific applications. Intended primarily to be used by a single user, they are commonly connected to a local area network and run multi-user operating systems. The term workstation has been used loosely to refer to everything from a mainframe computer terminal to a PC connected to a network, but the most common form refers to the class of hardware offered by several current and defunct companies such as Sun Microsystems, Silicon Graphics, Apollo Computer, DEC, HP, NeXT, and IBM which powered the 3D computer graphics revolution of the late 1990s.

Workstations formerly offered higher performance than mainstream personal computers, especially in CPU, graphics, memory, and multitasking. Workstations are optimized for the visualization and manipulation of different types of complex data such as 3D mechanical design, engineering simulations like computational fluid dynamics, animation, medical imaging, image rendering, and mathematical plots. Typically, the form factor is that of a desktop computer, which consists of a high-resolution display, a keyboard, and a mouse at a minimum, but also offers multiple displays, graphics tablets, and 3D mice for manipulating objects and navigating scenes.  Workstations were the first segment of the computer market to present advanced accessories, and collaboration tools like videoconferencing.

The increasing capabilities of mainstream PCs since the late 1990s have reduced distinction between the PCs and workstations. Typical 1980s workstations have expensive proprietary hardware and operating systems to categorically distinguish from standardized PCs. From the 1990s and 2000s, IBM's RS/6000 and IntelliStation have RISC-based POWER CPUs running AIX, and its IBM PC Series and Aptiva corporate and consumer PCs have Intel x86 CPUs. However, by the early 2000s, this difference largely disappeared, since workstations use highly commoditized hardware dominated by large PC vendors, such as Dell, Hewlett-Packard, and Fujitsu, selling x86-64 systems running Windows or Linux.

History

Origins and development
Perhaps the first computer that might qualify as a workstation is the IBM 1620, a small scientific computer designed to be used interactively by a single person sitting at the console. It was introduced in 1959. One peculiar feature of the machine is that it lacks any arithmetic circuitry. To perform addition, it requires a memory-resident table of decimal addition rules. This reduced the cost of logic circuitry, enabling IBM to make it inexpensive. The machine is codenamed CADET and was initially rented for $1000 per month.

In 1965, the IBM 1130 scientific computer became the successor to 1620. Both of these systems run Fortran and other languages. They are built into roughly desk-sized cabinets, with console typewriters. They have optional add-on disk drives, printers, and both paper-tape and punched-card I/O.

Early workstations are generally dedicated minicomputers, a multiuser system reserved for one user. For example, the PDP-8 from Digital Equipment Corporation, is regarded as the first commercial minicomputer.

The Lisp machines developed at MIT in the early 1970s pioneered some workstation principles, as high-performance, networked, single-user systems intended for heavily interactive use. Lisp Machines were commercialized beginning 1980 by companies like Symbolics, Lisp Machines, Texas Instruments (the TI Explorer) and Xerox (the Interlisp-D workstations). The first computer designed for a single user, with high-resolution graphics (and so a workstation in the modern sense of the term), is the Alto developed at Xerox PARC in 1973. Other early workstations include the Terak 8510/a (1977), Three Rivers PERQ (1979), and the later Xerox Star (1981).

1980s rise in popularity
In the early 1980s, with the advent of 32-bit microprocessors such as the Motorola 68000, several new competitors appeared, including Apollo Computer and Sun Microsystems, with workstations based on 68000 and Unix. Meanwhile, DARPA's VLSI Project created several spinoff graphics products, such as the Silicon Graphics 3130. Target markets were differentiated, with Sun and Apollo considered to be network workstations and SGI as graphics workstations. RISC CPUs increased in the mid-1980s, typical of workstation vendors.

Workstations often feature SCSI or Fibre Channel disk storage systems, high-end 3D accelerators, single or multiple 64-bit processors, large amounts of RAM, and well-designed cooling.  Additionally, the companies that make the products tend to have comprehensive repair/replacement plans.  As the distinction between workstation and PC fades, however, workstation manufacturers have increasingly employed "off-the-shelf" PC components and graphics solutions rather than proprietary hardware or software. Some "low-cost" workstations are still expensive by PC standards but offer binary compatibility with higher-end workstations and servers made by the same vendor. This allows software development to take place on low-cost (relative to the server) desktop machines.

Thin clients
Workstations diversified to the lowest possible price point as opposed to performance, called the thin client or network computer. Dependent upon a network and server, this reduces the machine to having no hard drive, and only the CPU, keyboard, mouse, and screen.  Some diskless nodes still run a traditional operating system and perform computations locally, with storage on a remote server. These are intended to reduce the initial system purchase cost, and the total cost of ownership, by reducing the amount of administration required per user.

This approach was first attempted as a replacement for PCs in office productivity applications, with the 3Station by 3Com. In the 1990s, X terminals filled a similar role for technical computing. Sun's thin clients include the Sun Ray product line. However, traditional workstations and PCs continued to drop in price and complexity, undercutting this market.

3M computer

A high-end workstation of the early 1980s with the three Ms, or a "3M computer" (coined by Raj Reddy and his colleagues at CMU), has one megabyte of RAM, a megapixel display (roughly 1000×1000 pixels), and one "MegaFLOPS" compute performance (at least one million floating-point operations per second). RFC 782 defines the workstation environment more generally as "hardware and software dedicated to serve a single user", and that it provisions additional shared resources. This is at least one order of magnitude beyond the capacity of the personal computer of the time. Other features beyond the typical personal computer include networking, graphics acceleration, and high-speed internal and peripheral data buses.

Decline
The more widespread adoption of these technologies into mainstream PCs was a direct factor in the decline of the workstation as a separate market segment:

 Extremely reliable components: together with multiple CPUs with greater cache and error-correcting memory, this may remain the distinguishing feature of a workstation today. Although most technologies implemented in modern workstations are also available at a lower cost for the consumer market, finding good components and making sure they work compatibly with each other is a great challenge in workstation building. Because workstations are designed for high-end tasks such as weather forecasting, video rendering, and game design, it is taken for granted that these systems must be running under full load, non-stop for several hours or even days without issue. Any off-the-shelf components can be used to build a workstation, but the reliability of such components under such rigorous conditions is uncertain. For this reason, almost no workstations are built by the customer themselves but rather purchased from a vendor such as Hewlett-Packard / HP Inc., Fujitsu, IBM, Lenovo, Sun Microsystems, SGI, Apple, or Dell.
 High-performance 3D graphics hardware for computer-aided design  (CAD) and computer-generated imagery (CGI) animation is increasingly popular in the PC market around the mid-to-late 1990s mostly driven by computer gaming, yielding the first official GPU in Nvidia's NV10 and the breakthrough GeForce 256.
 High-performance CPUs: the first RISC of the early 1980s offer roughly one order of magnitude in performance improvement over CISC processors of comparable cost. Intel's x86 CISC family always had the edge in market share and the economies of scale that this implied. By the mid-1990s, some CISC processors like the Motorola 68040 and Intel's 80486 and Pentium have performance parity with RISC in some areas, such as integer performance (at the cost of greater chip complexity) and hardware floating-point calculations, relegating RISC to even more high-end markets.
 Hardware support for floating-point operations: optional on the original IBM PC; remained on a separate chip for Intel systems until the 80486DX processor. Even then, x86 floating-point performance lags other processors due to limitations in its architecture. Today even low-price PCs now have performance in the gigaFLOPS range.
 High-performance/high-capacity data storage: early workstations tend to use proprietary disk interfaces until the SCSI standard of the mid-1980s.  Although SCSI interfaces soon became available for IBM PCs, they were comparatively expensive and tend to be limited by the speed of the PC's ISA peripheral bus. SCSI is an advanced controller interface good for multitasking and daisy chaining. This makes it suited for use in servers, and its benefits to desktop PCs which mostly run single-user operating systems are less clear, but it is standard on the 1980s-1990s Macintosh. Serial ATA is more modern, with throughput comparable to SCSI but at a lower cost.
 High-speed networking (10 Mbit/s or better): 10 Mbit/s network interfaces were commonly available for PCs by the early 1990s, although by that time workstations were pursuing even higher networking speeds, moving to 100 Mbit/s, 1 Gbit/s, and 10 Gbit/s.  However, economies of scale and the demand for high-speed networking in even non-technical areas have dramatically decreased the time it takes for newer networking technologies to reach commodity price points.
 Large displays (17- to 21-inch) with high resolutions and high refresh rate, which were rare among PCs in the late 1980s and early 1990s but became common among PCs by the late 1990s.
 Large memory configurations: PCs (such as IBM clones) are originally limited to 640  KB of RAM until the 1982 introduction of the 80286 processor; early workstations have megabytes of memory. IBM clones require special programming techniques to address more than 640 KB until the 80386, as opposed to other 32-bit processors such as SPARC which provide straightforward access to nearly their entire 4  GB memory address range.  64-bit workstations and servers supporting an address range far beyond 4  GB have been available since the early 1990s, a technology just beginning to appear in the PC desktop and server market in the mid-2000s.
 Operating system: early workstations ran the Unix operating system (OS), a Unix-like variant, or an unrelated equivalent OS such as VMS. The PC CPUs of the time have limitations in memory capacity and memory access protection, making them unsuitable to run OSes of this sophistication, but this, too, began to change in the late 1980s as PCs with the 32-bit 80386 with integrated paged MMUs became widely affordable and enabling OS/2 and Windows NT 3.1.
 Tight integration between the OS and the hardware: Workstation vendors both design the hardware and maintain the Unix operating system variant that runs on it. This allows for much more rigorous testing than is possible with an operating system such as Windows. Windows requires that third-party hardware vendors write compliant hardware drivers that are stable and reliable. Also, minor variations in hardware quality such as timing or build quality can affect the reliability of the overall machine. Workstation vendors are able to ensure both the quality of the hardware, and the stability of the operating system drivers by validating these things in-house, and this leads to a generally much more reliable and stable machine.

Market position

Since the late 1990s, the workstation and consumer markets have further merged. Many low-end workstation components are now the same as the consumer market, and the price differential narrowed. For example, most Macintosh Quadra computers were originally intended for scientific or design work, all with the Motorola 68040 CPU, backward compatible with 68000 Macintoshes. The consumer Macintosh IIcx and Macintosh IIci models can be upgraded to the Quadra 700. "In an era when many professionals preferred Silicon Graphics workstations, the Quadra 700 was an intriguing option at a fraction of the cost" as resource-intensive software such as Infini-D brought "studio-quality 3D rendering and animations to the home desktop". The Quadra 700 can run A/UX 3.0, making it a Unix workstation. Another example is the Nvidia GeForce 256 consumer graphics card, which spawned the Quadro workstation card, which has the same GPU but different driver support and certifications for CAD applications and a much higher price.

Workstations have typically driven advancements in CPU technology. All computers benefit from multi-processor and multicore designs (essentially, multiple processors on a die). The multicore design was pioneered by IBM's POWER4; it and Intel Xeon have multiple CPUs, more on-die cache, and ECC memory.

Some workstations are designed or certified for use with only one specific application such as AutoCAD, Avid Xpress Studio HD, or 3D Studio Max. The certification process increases workstation prices.

Current market

Decline of RISC workstations
By January 2009, all RISC-based workstation product lines had been discontinued:
 Hewlett-Packard withdrew its last HP 9000 PA-RISC-based desktop products from the market in January 2008.
 IBM retired the IntelliStation POWER on January 2, 2009.
 SGI ended general availability of its MIPS-based SGI Fuel and SGI Tezro workstations in December 2006.
 Sun Microsystems announced end-of-life for its last Sun Ultra SPARC workstations in October 2008.

In early 2018, RISC workstations were reintroduced in a series of IBM POWER9-based systems by Raptor Computing Systems. The Mac transition to Apple silicon greatly increased performance, power efficiency, and size efficiency over x86-64 with its ARM-based RISC architecture.

x86-64
Most of the current workstation market uses x86-64 microprocessors. Operating systems include Windows, FreeBSD, Linux distributions, macOS, and Solaris. Some vendors also market commodity mono-socket systems as workstations.

These are three types of workstations:
 Workstation blade systems (IBM HC10 or Hewlett-Packard xw460c. Sun Visualization System is akin to these solutions)
 Ultra high-end workstation (SGI Virtu VS3xx)
 Deskside systems containing server-class CPUs and chipsets on large server-class motherboards with high-end RAM (HP Z-series workstations and Fujitsu CELSIUS workstations)

Definition
A high-end desktop market segment includes workstations, with PC operating systems and components. Component product lines may be segmented, with premium components that are functionally similar to the consumer models but with higher robustness or performance.

A workstation-class PC may have some of the following features:
 Larger number of memory sockets which use registered (buffered) modules
 Multiple displays
 Reliable high-performance graphics card
 Multiple processor sockets, powerful CPUs
 Run reliable operating system with advanced features
 Support for ECC memory

See also
 Mobile workstation
 Gaming computer
 List of computer system manufacturers
 Music workstation
 Personal supercomputer
 Remote Graphics Software

References

External links
 

 American inventions
 Computer workstations
 Classes of computers